The 1911–12 season in Swedish football, starting January 1911 and ending July 1912:

Honours

Official titles

Competitions

Promotions, relegations and qualifications

Promotions

Relegations

Domestic results

Svenska Serien 1911–12

Mellansvenska Serien 1911–12
Mellansvenska

Västsvenska

Västsvenska Serien 1912

Svenska Mästerskapet 1911
Final

Corinthian Bowl 1911
Final

Kamratmästerskapen 1911
Final

Wicanderska Välgörenhetsskölden 1911
Final

National team results

 Sweden: Oskar Bengtsson - Knut Sandlund, Jacob Levin - Ragnar Wicksell, Götrik Frykman, Sixten Öberg - Herman Myhrberg, Gustaf Ekberg, Karl Gustafsson, Josef Appelgren, Karl Ansén.

 Sweden: Knut Gustavsson - Theodor Malm, Erik Lavass - Axel Lyberg, Götrik Frykman, Fritz Welander - Ivar Friberg, William Dahlström, Erik Börjesson, Helge Ekroth, Karl Ansén.

 Sweden: Gerhard Pettersson - Johannes Hellgren, Sven Pettersson - Sven Svensson, Hans Lindman, Erik Bohlin - Gunnar Pleijel, Karl Persson, Ludvig Ericsson, Adrian Brolin, Rudolf Andersson.

 Sweden: Josef Börjesson - Theodor Malm, Jacob Levin - Ragnar Wicksell, Knut Nilsson, John Olsson - Herman Myhrberg, Josef Appelgren, Erik Börjesson, Helge Ekroth, Karl Ansén.

 Sweden: Erik Bergqvist - Konrad Törnqvist, Henning Svensson - Ragnar Wicksell, Gustav Sandberg, Karl Gustafsson - Herman Myhrberg, Einar Halling-Johansson, Arvid Fagrell, Helge Ekroth, Karl Ansén.

 Sweden: Josef Börjesson - Theodor Malm, Jacob Levin - Ragnar Wicksell, Gustav Sandberg, Karl Gustafsson - Herman Myhrberg, Einar Halling-Johansson, Erik Börjesson, Iwar Swensson, Erik Bergström.

 Sweden: Herbert Svensson - Theodor Malm, Konrad Törnqvist - Gustaf Ekberg, Knut Nilsson, Oscar Gustafsson - Axel Bohm, Karl Persson, Eric Dahlström, Hjalmar Lorichs, Birger Carlsson.

 Sweden: Josef Börjesson - Jacob Levin, Erik Bergström - Ragnar Wicksell, Gustav Sandberg, Karl Gustafsson - Herman Myhrberg, Iwar Swensson, Erik Börjesson, Helge Ekroth, Karl Ansén.

 Sweden: Josef Börjesson - Erik Bergström, Konrad Törnqvist - Ragnar Wicksell, Götrik Frykman, Karl Gustafsson - Herman Myhrberg, Iwar Swensson, Erik Börjesson, Eric Dahlström, Karl Ansén.

National team players in season 1911/12

Notes

References
Print

Online

 
Seasons in Swedish football